The Kerala Sahitya Akademi Award for Scholarly Literature is an award given every year by the Kerala Sahitya Akademi (Kerala Literary Academy) to Malayalam writers for writing scholarly literature (science literature) of literary merit. It is one of the twelve categories of the Kerala Sahitya Akademi Award.

Awardees

References

Kerala Sahitya Akademi Awards
Malayalam literary awards
2011 establishments in Kerala
Awards established in 2011